Grete Minde is a 1977 Austrian-German drama film based on the novel by Theodor Fontane and directed by Heidi Genée. It was entered into the 27th Berlin International Film Festival.

Cast
 Katerina Jacob as Grete Minde
 Siemen Rühaak as Valtin Zernitz
 Hannelore Elsner as Trude Minde
 Tilo Prückner as Gerd Minde
 Brigitte Grothum as Emerentz Zernitz
 Käthe Haack as Domina
 Hans Christian Blech as Gigas
 Hilde Sessak as Regine
 Martin Flörchinger as Vater Minde
 Horst Niendorf as Valtins Onkel

References

External links

1977 films
1977 drama films
West German films
1970s German-language films
Austrian drama films
German drama films
Films about arson
Films based on German novels
Films based on works by Theodor Fontane
Films directed by Heidi Genée
Films set in the 1610s
Films set in Germany
Films produced by Bernd Eichinger
1977 directorial debut films
1970s German films